This article regards brewing in North Carolina.

History 
The earliest documented commercial brewery in North Carolina was in the Moravian town of Bethabara in Wachovia. According to the Moravian Diaries, a log house was constructed for a distillery and brewery in 1756. The May, 1764 brewery and distillery inventory listed 270 gallons of brandy, 40 gallons of rye whisky, and 90 gallons of beer on hand. The Bethabara brewery and distillery continued operating until the last brewer moved away in 1814. The Bethabara brewery operated longer than the Single Brother's Brewery in nearby Salem, NC

In 1985 Uli Bennewitz pushed a change in the North Carolina law books.  This change made it legal for a brewpub to exist under state laws.  The next year (1986) Bennewitz opened NC's first brewpub, Weeping Radish Bavarian Restaurant.

On August 13, 2005, House Bill 392 from the NC General Assembly was signed by then-Governor Michael F. Easley.  HB 392 (commonly known as the "Pop The Cap" Bill ) defined a "malt beverage" as any "beer, lager, malt liquor, ale, porter, and any other brewed or fermented beverage" that contained between .5% and 16% alcohol by volume. This represented an increase from the previous limit of 6%.  As of 2021, there were more than 340 active breweries in North Carolina.

Breweries

 Biltmore Brewing Company – Asheville
 Boojum Brewing Company – Waynesville
 Bourbon County Brewery – High Point
 Brueprint Brewing Company – Apex
 Bulgarian Brewing Company – Greensboro
 Cavendish Brewery – Gastonia
 Good Vibes Brewing Company – Carolina Beach, Wilmington
 Kind Beers – Charlotte
 Little City Brewing Company – Raleigh
 Lumina Winery & Brewery – Wilmington
 Mansfield Brewery – Greensboro
 Rusted Mill Artisan Ales – Gastonia
 Salud Beer Shop Nanobrewery – Charlotte
 Weeping Radish Farm Brewery – Grandy

See also 
 Beer in the United States
 List of breweries in the United States
 List of microbreweries

References

External links
 North Carolina breweries directory
  NC Beer History Timeline

 
North Carolina
North Carolina-related lists